Fotini "Fofi" Gennimata (17 November 1964 – 25 October 2021) was a Greek politician who served as president of the Panhellenic Socialist Movement (PASOK) from 2015 to 2021. During her tenure as party leader, she also co-founded and led the Democratic Alignment and the Movement for Change, two successive political alliances of centre-left parties formed around PASOK. She was the daughter of Georgios Gennimatas, a high-profile government minister during the PASOK administrations of the 1980s and 1990s.

Gennimata served as a minister in the Cabinet of George Papandreou between 2009 and 2011, first as Deputy Minister of Health and Welfare and later as Alternate Minister of Education, Lifelong Learning and Religious Affairs.

Early life and education 
Gennimata was born in Ampelokipoi, Athens, the daughter of PASOK politician Georgios Gennimatas. She graduated from the Department of Political Science and Public Administration at the University of Athens in 1987. When at university, she was a member of the socialist student union. Prior to her entry into a political career, she began working as a banker in 1986 and for the National Bank of Greece.

Political career 
After the legislative elections of 2000, at the age of 36 Gennimata became a member of the Hellenic parliament for PASOK and representing the Athens A constituency, a position she held until she resigned in 2002 to run for local elections.

From 2001 to 2004, she served as a member of PASOK's Central Committee, and from 2003 to 2009 she was a member of the Executive Bureau and the Political Council of PASOK. In August 2002 she was named PASOK candidate in the 2002 local elections for the Super-Prefecture of Athens and Piraeus, elections she won in the second round with 56.3% of the votes. She was re-elected in the first round of the 2006 local elections with 43.4% of the votes. Her term was characterized by continuous clashes with the national government, reluctant to Gennimata's demands that the central administration decentralize more and give more responsibilities to local governments.

Few days before the 2007 legislative elections, Gennimata resigned as mayor to lead PASOK's regional candidacy, but the Supreme Court blocked this move as ruled that according to Article 57 of the Constitution of Greece, local government officials cannot stand for election as MPs until they have seen their term out. Between 2003 and 2007 she was also president of the Greek Union of Prefectures.

She was elected deputy again in the 2009 legislative election. In October 2009, newly elected Prime Minister George Papandreou appointed her Deputy Minister of Health and Welfare, office she held until September 2010. From September 2010 to November 2011, she served as an Alternate Minister of Education, Lifelong Learning and Religious Affairs in the same cabinet. In 2011, PM Lucas Papademos named her Deputy Minister of the Interior. In 2012, Gennimata was appointed a spokesperson for PASOK thus resigned from her cabinet position.

She was also Deputy Minister of National Defence between June 2013 and January 2015.

Leader of PASOK
Gennimata was elected as Leader of the Panhellenic Socialist Movement at their tenth conference in 2015, after Evangelos Venizelos stepped down as leader a year before the conclusion of his term. She won the leadership election with 51% of the vote, beating Odysseas Konstantinopoulos and Andreas Loverdos.

On 30 August 2015, together with the chairman of DIMAR Thanasis Theocharopoulos she announced that both parties would unite in a single candidacy called Democratic Alignment (DISI) for the September 2015 snap election and she would be the one to lead it. The candidacy won 17 seats, 4 more than the seats PASOK won in the January election.

On 20 November 2017 Gennimata was elected as leader of Movement for Change with 56% of the vote, beating Nikos Androulakis. On 24 November 2017, she was re-elected as president of PASOK. In early 2021, Gennimata announced that she was seeking her re-election as leader of Movement for Change. On 12 October 2021, Gennimata was hospitalized due to health reasons and announced her withdrawal from the party leadership.

Illness and death 
In 2008 Gennimata was diagnosed with metastatic breast cancer; she spoke openly about her health issues. On 11 October 2021, Gennimata was hospitalized with ileus due to metastatic cancer. On 25 October 2021, she died at Evangelismos Hospital of Athens at the age of 56. The Greek parliament held a minute of silence and decided to suspend its sessions for one week to honor her. The Greek PM Kyriakos Mitsotakis declared a national day of mourning for 27 October 2021, the day Gennimata's funeral was held.

Gennimata's funeral was held on 27 October 2021 at the Metropolitan Cathedral of Athens; it was attended by Greek President Katerina Sakellaropoulou, Prime Minister Kyriakos Mitsotakis and Leader of the Opposition Alexis Tsipras.

Personal life 
Gennimata was the daughter of the prominent socialist minister Georgios Gennimatas and Kakia Vergou. Her mother, Kakia Vergou, was diagnosed with breast cancer in 1984. She died in September 1993, at the age of 54. Her father Georgios Gennimatas, was diagnosed with lung cancer in early 1992 and died on 25 April 1994 at age 54.

Gennimata married her first husband, Alexandros Ntekas, at the age of 22 with whom she had her elder daughter, Aimilia. She married her second husband, Andreas Tsounis, in 2003 with whom she had a daughter and a son.

References

External links 
  
 

1964 births
2021 deaths
Burials at the First Cemetery of Athens
20th-century Greek politicians
20th-century Greek women politicians
21st-century Greek politicians
21st-century Greek women politicians
Greek MPs 2000–2004
Greek MPs 2012 (May)
Greek MPs 2015 (February–August)
Greek MPs 2015–2019
Greek MPs 2019–2023
Leaders of PASOK
National and Kapodistrian University of Athens alumni
Politicians from Athens
Deaths from cancer in Greece
Deaths from breast cancer
Greek political party founders